Murari Raj Sharma (1951–2020) was a former ambassador for Nepal to the United Kingdom. He presented his letters of credence to the British Queen on February 12, 2008 at Buckingham Palace. Prior to this, he was a Member of the United Nations Advisory Committee on Administrative and Budgetary Questions. An award winning author, he wrote Reinventing the United Nations and Murari Adhikari's Short Stories. Sharma chaired a number of UN Committees. Sharma was involved in resolving issues caused by the hijacking of the Indian Airlines Flight 814.

References

Ambassadors of Nepal to the United Kingdom
Ambassadors of Nepal to the United States
Permanent Representatives of Nepal to the United Nations
United Nations Advisory Committee on Administrative and Budgetary Questions members
Ambassadors of Nepal to Brazil
Ambassadors of Nepal to Argentina
Ambassadors of Nepal to Cuba
Ambassadors of Nepal to Venezuela
Ambassadors of Nepal to Chile
Nepalese officials of the United Nations
1951 births
2020 deaths